LOT Polish Airlines Flight 16 was a Boeing 767 passenger jet on a scheduled service from Newark, United States, to Warsaw, Poland, that on 1 November 2011 made a successful gear-up emergency landing at Warsaw Chopin Airport, after its landing gear failed to extend. All 231 aboard survived without serious injuries. A leak in one of the aircraft's hydraulic systems occurred shortly after takeoff, resulting in the loss of all of the hydraulic fluid supplying the primary landing gear system.

History of the flight
LOT Polish Airlines Flight 16 was scheduled to arrive at Warsaw Chopin Airport from Newark Liberty International Airport on 1 November 2011 at 13:35 CET with 220 passengers and 11 crew on board. The aircraft operating the service was a Boeing 767-35DER, registered SP-LPC, named Poznań, serial number 28656. It was first delivered to LOT in 1997.

Within 30 minutes of departing from Newark, the crew received a warning that the center hydraulic system had malfunctioned. The decision was made to continue to Warsaw in order to use up the heavy load of fuel needed for the transatlantic flight. The aircraft proceeded to approach as normal, but aborted when the landing gear failed to deploy.

The crew informed Warsaw air traffic control (ATC) that they were unable to lower the landing gear due to a hydraulic system failure. The captain decided to circle the airport for over an hour, to consume excess fuel and to allow time for ground emergency services to prepare for the landing. Visual observation by two Polish Air Force F-16 fighter jets verified that none of the landing gear were down; attempts to lower the landing gear by alternative means failed.

Preparation for landing
The airport was evacuated for the arrival of the aircraft, and roads around the airport were closed to accommodate emergency services. Other flights which were due into Warsaw were diverted or returned to their point of departure.

At 14:40 CET the crew made a successful gear-up landing on Runway 33, with no injuries to anyone. The aircraft however, sustained substantial damage, resulting in a hull loss. All of those on board were evacuated within 90 seconds.

The airport remained closed to traffic until 16:00 CET, 3 November 2011, to enable removal of crash debris and then a final inspection of runways and aprons.

Shortly after the evacuation, a team from the Polish State Commission on Aircraft Accidents Investigation (SCAAI) discovered that the C829 circuit breaker, which protects a number of systems including the alternate landing gear extension system, was "popped", or opened, interrupting the circuit. The C4248 breaker for the alternate landing gear system remained closed.

After the plane was lifted off the runway, the C829 circuit breaker was closed, and the landing gear was extended using the alternate system. The plane was then towed to the LOT maintenance hangar for further investigation.

Flight crew

The captain of Flight 16 was Tadeusz Wrona, a 57-year-old veteran pilot with twenty years of experience on the 767. Both the captain and 51-year-old first officer Jerzy Szwarc held Airline Transport Pilot Licenses, accumulating over 25,000 hours of flying time between them, of which 15,000 were on 767 aircraft.

Investigation
The preliminary report by the SCAAI found that a hydraulic leak occurred shortly after takeoff, after the landing gear and flaps were retracted. The leak was caused by excessive bending of a flexible hose in the center hydraulic system, resulting in the loss of all fluid in that system. The drop in pressure was indicated by the EICAS and recorded by the flight data recorder.
Later investigation indicated a popped circuit breaker just to the right of the F/O at floor level would have enabled the electric motor for releasing the undercarriage. The breaker was reset after landing and the undercarriage extended normally.

The final report of the accident was released in 2017. The causes of the accident were the center hydraulic hose leak, the C829 circuit breaker popping, and the flight crew's failure to detect the C829 breaker during the approach, which could have allowed them to lower the landing gear. Contributing factors were the lack of safeguards to prevent accidental opening of circuit breakers, the C829 circuit breaker being in a low position where the flight crew would have difficulty noticing its condition, LOT's operations center inadequate procedures, and LOT's failure to incorporate a Boeing service bulletin on the prevention of excessive bending in the hydraulic system hose.

Aftermath
Polish President Bronisław Komorowski praised and thanked the crew for the successful landing. The Boeing 767, registration SP-LPC, was extensively damaged and LOT deemed the aircraft a hull loss. The accident represents the 14th hull loss of a Boeing 767. In November 2013, two years after the incident, the aircraft was scrapped. As of August 2022, the flight was operated by the Boeing 787. LOT ended its Boeing 767 services by 2013, replacing them with the Boeing 787.

References

External links

State Commission on Aircraft Accidents Investigation: "Lata 2010–2012" 
Drugie Oświadczenie Tymczasowe Państwowej Komisji Badania Wypadków Lotniczych dotyczące badania wypadku lotniczego nr 1400/2011 – 31 October 2013  (Archive)
Second Interim Statement of the State Commission on Aircraft Accident Investigation on investigation into air accident No 1400/2011 – 31 October 2013 (Archive)
Interim Statement
Interim Statement 
Preliminary Report  (Archive)
Preliminary Report  (Archive)
Final report  (Alternate)
Final report  – the Polish version is the report of record 
 Accident: LOT B763 at Warsaw on Nov 1st 2011, forced gear up landing
 Aviation Safety Net database entry for Aircraft accident Boeing 767-35DER SP-LPC Warszawa-Frédéric Chopin Airport (WAW) (contains copy of final accident report)
 

2011 in Poland
16
Airliner accidents and incidents caused by mechanical failure
Accidents and incidents involving the Boeing 767
Aviation accidents and incidents in Poland
Aviation accidents and incidents in 2011
Airliner accidents and incidents involving belly landings
2010s in Warsaw
November 2011 events in Europe
Airliner accidents and incidents caused by pilot error
2011 disasters in Poland